The Northern Han was a dynastic state of China and one of the Ten Kingdoms during the Five Dynasties and Ten Kingdoms period. It was founded by Liu Min (Emperor Shizu) as a continuation of the Later Han dynasty founded by his brother Liu Zhiyuan (Emperor Gaozu). The Northern Han lasted from 951 to 979, when it was conquered by the Northern Song dynasty.

Founding of the Northern Han
The short-lived state of  Later Han fell in 950 because of Guo Wei, a powerful military governor's de facto coup.  Liu Min founded the Northern Han Kingdom, sometimes referred to as the Eastern Han, in 951 claiming that he was the legitimate heir to the imperial throne of Later Han.  Liu Min immediately restored the traditional relationship with the Khitans, who had founded the Liao dynasty.

Sources conflict as to the origin of the Later Han and Northern Han emperors; some indicate sinicized Shatuo ancestry while some traditional historical sources claim that the emperors claimed patrilineal Han Chinese ancestry.

Territorial extent
The Northern Han was a small kingdom located in Shanxi with its capital located at Taiyuan. Shanxi had been a traditional base of power since the fading days of the Tang dynasty in the late ninth century and early tenth century. It was wedged between the two major powers of the day, the Liao dynasty to the north and the Later Zhou dynasty (then the Northern Song dynasty) to the south.

Wedge between Liao and Song
The existence of the Northern Han was one of the two major thorns in relations between the Liao Dynasty and Later Zhou's successor Northern Song, the other being the continued possession of the Sixteen Prefectures by the Liao Dynasty.  The Northern Han had placed itself under the protection of the Liao.

Emperor Taizu of Song was successful in nearly completing the incorporation of the southern kingdoms into the Song Dynasty by his death in 976.  His younger brother, Emperor Taizong wished to emulate his older brother's successes.  Wuyue was brought into the realm in 978.

Fall of the Northern Han
Emboldened by his success to the south, Emperor Taizong decided to embark on a campaign to finally destroy the Northern Han.  Leading the army himself, he brought his forces to the Northern Han capital of Taiyuan, which was laid under siege in June.  An initial relief force sent by the Liao was easily defeated by Song.  After a two-month siege of the capital, the emperor of the Northern Han surrendered and the kingdom was incorporated into the Northern Song.

Rulers

The family tree of the Later Han and Northern Han rulers

 - Later Han emperors;  - Northern Han emperors

Notes

References

Citations

Sources 

 

 
Later Han (Five Dynasties)
Dynasties in Chinese history
Former countries in Chinese history
Five Dynasties and Ten Kingdoms
951 establishments
10th-century establishments in China
970s disestablishments
10th-century disestablishments in China
States and territories established in the 950s
States and territories disestablished in the 970s
Northern China
Former kingdoms